In commutative algebra, a field of mathematics, the monomial conjecture of Melvin Hochster says the following:

Let A be a Noetherian local ring of Krull dimension d and let x1, ..., xd be a system of parameters for A (so that A/(x1, ..., xd) is an Artinian ring). Then for all positive integers t, we have

 

The statement can relatively easily be shown in characteristic zero.

References

See also
 Homological conjectures in commutative algebra

Commutative algebra
Conjectures